Ophichthus woosuitingi is an eel in the family Ophichthidae (worm/snake eels). It was described by Johnson T. F. Chen in 1929. It is a marine, subtropical eel which is known from the western Pacific Ocean.

References

Fish described in 1929
woosuitingi